"Dreaming" is a song by pop singers and S Club 8 members Frankie Sandford and Calvin Goldspink, released as the first single from the I Dream TV series soundtrack album Welcome to Avalon Heights.

It was released on 15 November 2004, peaking at #19 on the UK Singles Chart.

Frankie Sandford sings the whole song along with Calvin, plus solo backing vocals in the intro and during the bridge. Calvin Goldspink sings the whole song along with Frankie. Aaron Renfree, Stacey McClean, Rochelle Wiseman, Daisy Evans, Hannah Richings and Jay Asforis do not have any solos in this song.

Track listing
CD 1
 "Dreaming"
 "Welcome to Avalon Heights"

CD2
 "Dreaming"
 "Take Me As I Am"
 "I'm Here"
 "Dreaming" (Karaoke version)
 "Dreaming" (D-Bop Vocal Mix)
 "Dreaming" (Music video)

2004 singles
2004 songs
Polydor Records singles
S Club 8 songs
Song articles with missing songwriters